Ana Laura is the debut studio album by contemporary Christian music recording artist Ana Laura, and the album released on March 7, 2006 by Reunion Records that Rob Graves produced. The album received a positive impression from music critics.

Background
The album was released on March 7, 2006 by Reunion Records, and the producer was Rob Graves. This was Ana Laura's first studio album.

Critical reception

Ana Laura garnered a generally positive reception from music critics. At CCM Magazine, Robert Mineo was critical of the lack of soul in her vocals, but noted that "The production is clean as a whistle and the singing displays better than expected command over an impressive set of pipes." Justin Mabee of Jesus Freak Hideout said she has much learning yet to do, but wrote that "She shows her talent in different genres throughout her self-titled debut, like jazz, rock, and especially piano-based tunes." At Christianity Today, Andree Farias stated that "Ana Laura is a nostalgic reminder of why we liked pop divas to begin with, and perhaps may encourage its fanciful heroines to get back to what first made them popular." Trevor Kirk of Cross Rhythms highlighted that "the album is stuffed full of radio-friendly, easy-to-listen-to, classy pop; though its strong American production flavour won't appeal to all Brits."

Track listing

Singles
If You Ever Fall (2005)
Water (2005)
Completely (2005)
Sometimes (2006)

References

2006 debut albums
Reunion Records albums